The First cabinet of Nicolas Jean-de-Dieu Soult was announced on 16 May 1832 by King Louis Philippe I.
It replaced the Cabinet of Casimir Périer.
It was dissolved on 18 July 1834 and replaced by the Cabinet of Étienne Maurice, comte Gérard.

Ministers

The cabinet was created by ordinances of 11 October 1832, with Marshall Soult as president. The ministers were:

Changes
On 31 December 1832:

On 4 April 1834:

On 19 May 1834:

References

Sources

 

French governments
1832 establishments in France
1834 disestablishments in France
Cabinets established in 1832
Cabinets disestablished in 1834